Luta may refer to:
The former name of a Chinese city formed by the agglomeration of Lushun and Dalian (Dairen); the city is now called Dalian (Dairen) 
Chamoru name for Rota in the Mariana Islands
Luta, Lublin Voivodeship (east Poland)
Luta, Świętokrzyskie Voivodeship (south-central Poland)
  or Liutianka, a river in Ukraine, a tributary of Uzh River
 Luţa, a village in Beclean Commune, Braşov County, Romania
 LUTA Sportswear, a sportswear brand which gives half its profits to Fight for Peace
Luta -Lakota for the color red or crimson. Lakota is one of three languages spoken by the Oceti Sakowin Sioux Tribes that are indigenous to the United States. 

          

corno